World Without End (also known as Flight to the Future) is a 1956 science fiction film directed by Edward Bernds and starring Hugh Marlowe and Nancy Gates. It was made in CinemaScope and Technicolor by Allied Artists and produced by Richard Heermance.

World Without End features an early screen role for Australian-born Rod Taylor. The film was distributed on a double feature with the Lon Chaney Jr. film Indestructible Man.

Plot
In March 1957, commander Dr. Eldon Galbraithe, engineer Henry Jaffe, radioman Herbert Ellis and scientist John Borden, are returning to Earth from the first spaceflight, a reconnaissance trip around Mars. Suddenly, their spaceship is somehow accelerated to incredible velocities, and they are knocked unconscious. Their ship crash lands on a snow-covered mountain. When they venture out, they discover that they have become victims of time dilation and are now in the future.

They theorize, from seeing time-worn gravestones and after their ship's instruments register heightened residual radiation, that a devastating atomic war had broken out in 2188, and that they are at least 200 years past that date. (They later learn that the year is 2508). Jaffe is particularly hard hit, as he realizes that his wife and children have long since died.

After surviving an ambush by giant, mutant spiders, they are attacked by one of the two remnants of human society. The "mutates" (as the astronauts label them) are violent, primitive surface dwellers. They have mutated due to generations of exposure to heightened radioactivity. (However, the background radiation has decreased to tolerable levels, and the men later learn that normal humans are often born to the mutates. These, however, are enslaved.)

Seeking shelter from the attacking mutates in a cave, the four men discover the entrance to an underground city, whose residents are the descendants of those who fled there from the atomic war. These people live in a high-tech, sophisticated culture. They are a peaceful group led by Timmek, the president of the ruling council. Underground, the men have grown less virile, and there are fewer and fewer children born each generation. In contrast, the women remain physically vital (and ready for romance). Elain, admires a shirtless Herbert Ellis, commenting that the astronauts are "more muscular than our men". Deena, rescued from the surface as a child, falls in love with Ellis.

The astronauts try to persuade the underground people to arm themselves and reclaim the surface, but they are content with their comfortable existence.

When Timmek's daughter Garnet shows she is attracted to John Borden, Mories, an already hostile member of the council, becomes jealous. He retrieves the astronauts' confiscated pistols, but has to kill a man when he is caught in the act. Mories plants the guns in the astronauts' quarters. Finding the weapons, Timmek orders the astronauts expelled, but Deena testifies that she saw Mories hide the guns. Mories flees to the surface, where he is killed by mutates.

With Timmek now cooperative, the astronauts manufacture a bazooka and head back to the surface. Fleeing the deadly bazooka fire, the mutates take shelter in caves. Borden offers to fight their chief, Naga, in single combat for leadership of the mutates after Naga threatens to slaughter the unmutated slaves. Borden slays Naga and orders the remaining deformed mutates to leave. The astronauts then establish a thriving settlement, including members of both groups.

Cast

 Hugh Marlowe as Borden
 Nancy Gates as Garnet
 Nelson Leigh as Galbraithe
 Rod Taylor as Ellis
 Lisa Montell as Deena
 Christopher Dark as Jaffe
 Booth Colman as Mories
 Everett Glass as Timmek
 Shawn Smith as Elaine
 Stanley Fraser as Elda

Production
Under the working title, Flight to the Future, principal photography took place from July 19 to early August 1955. Locations included the Iverson Movie Ranch in Chatsworth, California.

Edward Bernds was a prolific director with experience in both television and cinema, and worked in many different genres. In 1956, he also helmed the comedy Navy Wife and crime thriller Calling Homicide. In directing World Without End, Bernds "crammed" in order to make a science fiction film. He studied Albert Einstein's theory of relativity to give his space and time travellers a plausible way to go into the future.

World Without End was partly made in order to reuse footage and costumes from the earlier Allied Artists science fiction film Flight to Mars (1951). A number of people who worked on the film went on to have notable film careers, including Sam Peckinpah (dialogue director) and Walter Mirisch (an executive at Allied Artists). Alberto Vargas (set sketches) was a famed artist whose only screen credit was World Without End.

Reception
World Without End was "sufficiently successful" and drew attention from the estate of H.G. Wells. The similarities to The Time Machine (1895) led to a threatened lawsuit. The plot of World Without End was later repeated in other films, The Mole People (1956), The Time Travelers (1964), and Planet of the Apes (1968). Rod Taylor would later star in George Pal's The Time Machine (1960), based on an adaptation of the H.G. Wells novel.

As a "B" movie, World Without End received few critical reviews, although one reviewer commented that the appearance of a shirtless Rod Taylor, contains "... the best bit of beefcake in the entire genre". In a later 1986 interview in Starlog magazine, Taylor recalled: "I was so thrilled to have a sizable role in an American movie. It gave me the confidence to know that I could work with established Hollywood professionals and come out maybe equally as well". The director was taken with the enthusiasm of his fifth-credited actor, who literally threw himself into the role (struggling with a mutant spider).

See also
 List of American films of 1956

Notes

References

Bibliography

 Vagg, Stephen. Rod Taylor: An Aussie in Hollywood. Albany, Georgia: Bear Manor Media, 2010. .
 Warren, Bill. Keep Watching The Skies Vol I: 1950–1957. Jefferson, North Carolina: McFarland & Company, 1982. .

External links

 
 
 
 
 

1956 films
1950s monster movies
1950s science fiction films
American monster movies
CinemaScope films
American science fiction films
Allied Artists films
Films about astronauts
Films about time travel
Films scored by Leith Stevens
Films set in 1957
Films set in the 26th century
American post-apocalyptic films
Films directed by Edward Bernds
1950s English-language films
1950s American films